The Philebus (occasionally given as Philebos;) is a Socratic dialogue written in the 4th century BC by Plato. Besides Socrates (the main speaker) the other interlocutors are Philebus and Protarchus. Philebus, who advocates the life of physical pleasure (hedonism), hardly participates, and his position is instead defended by Protarchus, who learnt argumentation from Sophists.  Socrates proposes there are higher pleasures (such as those of the mind) as well as lower ones, and asks if the best life isn't one that optimally mixes both.

Manuscripts of the work give it the subtitle "peri hēdonēs, ēthikos" ("ethics/moral concerning pleasure") implying that its topic is "concerning pleasure" and it is a work on ethics — that is, the question of what way of life is best. However "there are large parts in the dialogue that deal with dialectics and ontology but have nothing to do with pleasure and ethics, or if so, only indirectly".

Date of composition
It has been proposed that the work was composed between 360 and 347 BC, and that it is among the last of the late dialogues of Plato, many of which do not figure Socrates as the main speaking character. The dialogue is generally considered to contain less humor than earlier dialogues, and to emphasize philosophy and speculation over drama and poetry.

Contents

The dialogue's central question concerns the relative value of pleasure and knowledge, and produces a model for thinking about how complex structures are developed. Socrates begins by summarizing the two sides of the dialogue:

Philebus was saying that enjoyment and pleasure and delight, and the class of feelings akin to them, are a good to every living being, whereas I contend, that not these, but wisdom and intelligence and memory, and their kindred, right opinion and true reasoning, are better and more desirable than pleasure for all who are able to partake of them, and that to all such who are or ever will be they are the most advantageous of all things.

This contest between a life of ease and pleasure and a life of the mind was already a "rich tradition" among earlier Greek philosophers, and was also dealt with in other dialogues of Plato such as the Gorgias and the Republic. But Socrates and his interlocutors go on to dismiss both pleasure and knowledge as unsatisfactory, reasoning that the truly good is a third type, one of a measured and rational mixture of the two. Socrates already hints that this will be the conclusion in the first lines of the dialogue. The discussion, however, then turns to a complex discussion of which of the two types of life should be awarded second prize. Thought and reason are declared to be winners of this second prize, but in order to reach and explain this conclusion, Socrates expounds a proposed connection between reason and thought and nature, the orderliness of being itself, including the being of happiness and good. Socrates and Protarchus agree that "the body of the universe had a soul, since that body has the same elements as ours, only in every way superior". This argument was also put in the mouth of Socrates by Plato in his Phaedo where Socrates explains that this was a belief he always found lacking in the philosophy of Anaxagoras. Very similar beliefs are reported of Socrates by Plato's less well-known contemporary Xenophon of Athens.

Commentators such as Friedrich Schleiermacher have noted that "the initial question is by no means the only and perhaps not even the main tendency of the conversation" and Paul Friedländer notes further that the dialogue goes beyond not only the "simple question" but also its "simple answer (that the truly good and perfect is above both reason and pleasure, but thought and intelligence are incomparably closer to perfection than pleasure and enjoyment can ever be)".

One of the major ontological themes of the work is that there are four kinds of being, or four "elements":
1. The limitless. These are the types of things of which we make relative comparisons such as more or less.
2. The limited. These are the types of things which can be given a definite measurement of number.
3. The mixed kind of being, mixes the first two, limiting and various types of limitless beings in the "world of becoming" and change which people experience, or at least that aspect of it which is not arbitrary and aimless, but a more genuine kind of becoming that aims at being.
4. The cause of such genuine mixture, which limits the unlimited beings and orders nature. This, Socrates argues, is reason itself - not only human reason, but the greater reason of nature itself.

Texts and translations
Greek text and parallel English translation at Perseus
Bury, Robert G. (ed.). The Philebus of Plato. Cambridge University Press, 1897.  Greek text, Introduction and notes.
Plato: Statesman, Philebus, Ion. Greek with translation by Harold N. Fowler and W. R. M. Lamb. Loeb Classical Library 164. Harvard Univ. Press (originally published 1925).  HUP listing
Dorothea Frede: Philebus, Plato, translated, with introduction and notes. Hackett Publishing, Indianapolis 1993. 
Seth Benardete: The Tragedy and Comedy of Life. Plato’s Philebus. University of Chicago Press, Chicago/London 1993. 
Fowler translation at Perseus
Jowett translation at StandardEbooks
Plato. Opera, volume II. Oxford Classical Texts. 
Plato. Complete Works. Ed. J. M. Cooper and D. S. Hutchinson. Hackett, 1997.

References

Further reading
 
 
 Schofield, Malcolm (1998, 2002). "Later dialogues" In E. Craig (ed.), Routledge Encyclopedia of Philosophy. London: Routledge. Retrieved May 2019.
 'Measure for Measure' section on the Philebus in "Plato's Ethics: An Overview" at the Stanford Encyclopedia of Philosophy

External links 

 
 Overview at Gutenberg
 

Dialogues of Plato